Cirsonella parvula is a minute sea snail, a marine gastropod mollusc in the family Skeneidae.

Description

The height of the shell attains 0.8 mm, its diameter 0.9 mm.  It was first described by Baden Powell in 1926.

Distribution
This species is endemic to New Zealand and is found off South Island.

References

 Powell A. W. B., New Zealand Mollusca, William Collins Publishers Ltd, Auckland, New Zealand 1979 

parvula
Gastropods of New Zealand
Gastropods described in 1926